The 1965–66 Segunda División season was the 35th since its establishment and was played between 5 September 1965 and 3 April 1966.

Overview before the season
32 teams joined the league, including 4 relegated from the 1964–65 La Liga and 4 promoted from the 1964–65 Tercera División.

Relegated from La Liga
Murcia
Levante
Oviedo
Deportivo La Coruña

Promoted from Tercera División
Condal
Lérida
Rayo Vallecano
Badajoz

Group North

Teams

League table

Top goalscorers

Top goalkeepers

Results

Group South

Teams

League table

Top goalscorers

Top goalkeepers

Results

Promotion playoffs

First leg

Second leg

Relegation playoffs

First leg

Second leg

Tiebreaker

External links
BDFútbol

Segunda División seasons
2
Spain